Yves Duhaime (born May 27, 1939) is a former politician in Quebec, Canada.  He served as Cabinet Member and Member of the National Assembly of Quebec.

Early life
Duhaime was born in Chicoutimi, and grew up in Shawinigan.

In the 1960s, Duhaime was an officer with the 62nd (Shawinigan) Field Artillery Regiment. He reached the rank of Captain and served as Adjutant of the military unit.

He attended Séminaire Sainte-Marie and obtained a law degree from McGill University in Montreal and attended  the Institut d'Études Politiques de Paris.

Provincial politics

Duhaime ran as a Parti Québécois candidate in 1970, 1973 and 1976 in the district of Saint-Maurice.  He was elected on his third attempt.

Premier René Lévesque appointed him to the Cabinet.  Duhaime served as Minister of Tourism during his first term.

He was re-elected in 1981; he served as Minister of Energy from 1981 to 1984 and Minister of Finance from 1984 to 1985.

He did not run in 1985.

Federal politics

Duhaime was a candidate to the Bloc Québécois Leadership Convention of 1997 but finished second behind Gilles Duceppe. He also ran as a BQ candidate in the district of Saint-Maurice against the incumbent Member of Parliament and Prime Minister Jean Chrétien.  Chrétien won re-election with 47%.  Duhaime finished a strong second with 44%.

Local politics

Yves Duhaime ran for Mayor of Shawinigan in 2009. He finished second with 29% of the vote against organized labor activist Michel Angers (55%) and Ralliement Municipal candidate Claude Villemure (16%).

Notes

See also
62nd (Shawinigan) Field Artillery Regiment
Mauricie
Saint-Maurice Legislators
Saint-Maurice
Saint-Maurice Provincial Electoral District
Shawinigan

1939 births
Living people
Parti Québécois MNAs
Politicians from Saguenay, Quebec
Séminaire Sainte-Marie alumni
Canadian Army officers
Members of the Executive Council of Quebec
Bloc Québécois candidates for the Canadian House of Commons
Candidates in the 1997 Canadian federal election
McGill University Faculty of Law alumni
Sciences Po alumni
Royal Regiment of Canadian Artillery officers